List of surviving Vought F4U Corsairs identifies Corsairs with status of air worthy, on display, and in restoration by country; including model number, bureau number, fuselage markings, and location.

Argentina
On display
F4U-5
121928 – Museo de Aviacion Naval, Bahia Blanca NAS.

Australia
Airworthy

 F4U-1D

 82640 – Chance Vought-built in 1944, served on USS Intrepid. Completed its first post-restoration flight on February 28, 2022, after a lengthy restoration.

F4U-5
124493/VH-III – owned by Graham Hosking.
Under restoration
F4U-1
02270 – number 124 off of the production line, is under static restoration at Classic Jet Fighter Museum in Parafield, South Australia.

Austria

Airworthy
F4U-4
96995 – Tyrolean Jet Service in Salzburg & Innsbruck, sponsored by Red Bull.

Brazil
On display
F4U-1A
17995 – F4U-1A restored as an F4U-1 Birdcage Corsair at the TAM Museum, São Carlos, SP.

Canada
Airworthy
FG-1
92106 – Vintage Wings of Canada, Gatineau, Québec.  It was one of eight Corsairs to appear in the 1970s NBC series Baa Baa Black Sheep (later renamed Black Sheep Squadron).  It appeared in all 35 episodes.   (now in the colors of Robert Hampton Gray (KD658)). On 3 July 2019 the plane was damaged when it left the runway while landing at Gatineau Airport.  The pilot, John Aitken, a veteran RCAF fighter pilot, was hospitalized with a broken rib and nose. Paul Tremblay, the chief mechanic at Vintage Wings of Canada was optimistic about the condition of the plane and stated "we’ll definitely be able to get it going again". The aircraft is currently offered for sale on consignment by Platinum Fighter Sales in a damaged state as of Oct 31st, 2022.

France
Airworthy
F4U-5
124541 – Les Ailes de l'Aero in Cuers.
124724 – Salis Collection in La Ferte-Alais.

Honduras
On display
F4U-5
124715 (FAH-609) – Museo del Aire de Honduras, Tegucigalpa AB.
This Vought F4U Corsair with registration FAH-609 Air Force of Honduras, shot down three aircraft: a Cavalier F-51D Mustang and two Goodyear FG-1D Corsairs of the Salvadoran Air Force 17 July 1969, commanding by Captain Fernando Soto Henriquez. This was the last combat between piston engined aircraft.

New Zealand

Airworthy
FG-1D
88391/NZ5648/ZK-COR – owned by the Old Stick and Rudder Company, Masterton.

Under restoration
F4U-1
10508 – under restoration by Ross Jowitt in Ardmore, Auckland.
50000 – under restoration by Ross Jowitt in Ardmore, Auckland.

United Kingdom
Airworthy
FG-1
88297 – The Fighter Collection in Duxford.

On display
FG-1
14862 – Fleet Air Arm Museum in Yeovilton.

United States
Airworthy
F3A-1
04634 – based at the National Museum of World War II Aviation in Colorado Springs, Colorado. 
F4U-1A
17799 – based at Planes of Fame in Chino, California. It saw combat in the Pacific Theater of Operations with the VMF-441 "Blackjacks". One of eight Corsairs to appear in the 1970s NBC series Baa Baa Black Sheep (later renamed Black Sheep Squadron), it debuted in the first episode of season two, "Divine Wind," which aired on December 14, 1977, and appeared in 11 of the season's 13 episodes. 
F4U-4
81698 – based at War Eagles Air Museum in Santa Teresa, New Mexico.
97143 – also "Korean War Hero", based at the National Museum of World War II Aviation in Colorado Springs, Colorado.
97264 – privately owned in Houston, Texas.
97286 – based at Fantasy of Flight in Polk City, Florida.
97359 – privately owned in Kalispell, Montana.  In June/July 1953, while serving with VF-44 "Hornets", it flew combat missions over North Korea while flying from the decks of USS Lake Champlain & Boxer. It was one of eight Corsairs to appear in the 1970s NBC series Baa Baa Black Sheep (later renamed Black Sheep Squadron), appearing in all 35 episodes. 
97388 – based at Fargo Air Museum in Fargo, North Dakota.
F4U-5N
121881 – based at Lone Star Flight Museum in Houston, Texas.
124486 – based at Air Combat Museum in Springfield, Illinois.
F4U-5NL
124560 – privately owned in Ketchum, Idaho.
124692 – based at Collings Foundation in Stow, Massachusetts.
F4U-5P
122184 – based at Stonehenge Air Museum in Lincoln County, Montana.
F4U-7
133710 – privately owned by John O'Connor in Wilmington, Delaware. This aircraft was in service with the French Aéronavale with Flottille 12 in Tunisia in the 1950s. While there are no records to confirm it, it is believed this aircraft saw combat in Algeria and the Suez Crisis.  During the 1970s, while under the ownership of John "Shifty" Schafhausen of Spokane, Washington, it was one of eight Corsairs flown in the NBC series Baa Baa Black Sheep (later renamed Black Sheep Squadron).  It appeared in all 35 episodes.
133722 –  Based at Erickson Aircraft Collection in Madras, Oregon. It is in the markings of an F4U-4 flown by LTjg Jesse L. Brown, the first African-American Naval Aviator to see combat. He flew with VF-32 off the USS Leyte during the Korean War. Brown was shot down over North Korea during the Battle of Chosin Reservoir. His attempted rescue would lead to the Medal of Honor to be awarded to his wingman, Capt. Thomas J. Hudner Jr. Aircraft 133722 was in service with the French Aéronavale with Flottille 12. 
FG-1D
67070 – based at Lewis Air Legends in San Antonio, Texas.
67087 – privately owned in Guerneville, California.
67089 – based at American Airpower Museum in Farmingdale, New York.
88090 – privately owned in Buffalo, New York. Was NZ5612 in RNZAF service.
88303 – based at the Flying Heritage & Combat Armor Museum in Everett, Washington.
92050 – based at Warbird Heritage Foundation in Waukegan, Illinois.
92095 – privately owned in Latham, New York.
92399 – based at Cavanaugh Flight Museum in Addison, Texas.
92433 – based at Mid America Flight Museum in Mount Pleasant, Texas. It was formerly BuNo. 92471.  The original 92433, while under the ownership of Junior Burchinal, was one of eight Corsairs to appear in the 1970s NBC series Baa Baa Black Sheep (later renamed Black Sheep Squadron) and appeared in 30 of 35 episodes.
92463 – privately owned in Pembroke Pines, Florida.
92468 – based at Commemorative Air Force – (Dixie Wing) in Peachtree City, Georgia.
92489 – based at Dakota Territory Air Museum in Minot, North Dakota.
92508 – based at Military Aviation Museum in Virginia Beach, Virginia.
92629 – based at Palm Springs Air Museum in Palm Springs, California.  A combat veteran of the July 1969 Soccer War, this former El Salvadoran FG-1D was one of eight Corsairs to appear in the 1970s NBC series Baa Baa Black Sheep (later renamed Black Sheep Squadron).  It appeared in 32 or 35 episodes.
On display
F4U-1D
50375 – Steven F. Udvar-Hazy Center of the National Air and Space Museum in Chantilly, Virginia.
XF4U-4
80759 – New England Air Museum in Windsor Locks, Connecticut.
F4U-4

bureau number unknown – National World War II Museum in New Orleans, Louisiana.
96885 – USS Midway Museum in San Diego, California.
97142 – Pima Air & Space Museum in Tucson, Arizona.  It is on loan from the National Museum of the Marine Corps in Quantico, Virginia.
97259 – EAA AirVenture Museum in Oshkosh, Wisconsin. 
97349 – National Naval Aviation Museum, NAS Pensacola, Florida.
97369 – National Museum of the Marine Corps in Quantico, Virginia.
F4U-5N
122189 – Flying Leatherneck Aviation Museum, MCAS Miramar, California.
124447 – Mid-America Air Museum in Liberal, Kansas.
F4U-7
133704 – Currently on display at the San Diego Air & Space Museum in San Diego, California. This aircraft was formerly on display at the USS Alabama Museum. It was heavily damaged in Hurricane Katrina. It was taken apart and sent to the San Diego Air and Space Museum in 2008. Over a three-year period, it was restored as an AU-1 in the markings of San Diego Padres long time announcer Jerry Coleman. Coleman flew SBD Dauntless dive bombers during World War II and returned to the Marines to fly the Corsairs in Korea. This aircraft was delivered to the French in May 1953 where it saw service in Algeria and the Suez with the French Aéronavale Flottille 14.
FG-1A
13459 – National Museum of the Marine Corps in Quantico, Virginia.
FG-1D
88368 – Patriots Point Naval & Maritime Museum in Charleston, South Carolina.
88382 – Museum of Flight in Seattle, Washington.
92013 – US Navy Museum, Washington Navy Yard.
92085 – Selfridge ANGB Museum, Selfridge ANGB, Michigan.
92246 – National Naval Aviation Museum, NAS Pensacola, Florida.
92509 – Air Zoo in Kalamazoo, Michigan.
Under restoration
F4U-1
02449 – to airworthiness by private owner in Cameron Park, California.
02465 (early birdcage canopy) – for static display by the National Naval Aviation Museum in Pensacola, Florida.
F4U-4
81164 – to airworthiness by Westpac Restorations for private owner in Colorado Springs, Colorado.
81857 – to airworthiness by private owner in Kindred, North Dakota.
97280 – to airworthiness by private owner in Wilmington, Delaware after crashing on 29 July 1999.
97302 – to airworthiness by private owner in Wilmington, Delaware after crashing on 1 April 1993.
97390 – to airworthiness by Yanks Air Museum in Chino, California.
F4U-5N
122179 – to airworthiness by private owner in Greenwood, Mississippi after crashing on 25 February 1984.
FG-1D
76628 – to airworthiness by private owner in Castro Valley, California.
88086 – in storage at the Fantasy of Flight in Polk City, Florida
92132 – to airworthiness by the Tri-State Warbird Museum in Batavia, Ohio.  This aircraft was one of eight Corsairs to appear in the 1970s NBC series Baa Baa Black Sheep (later renamed Black Sheep Squadron).  It appeared in all 35 episodes.
92304 – to airworthiness by private owner in Ione, California.
92436 – to airworthiness by private owner in Hillsboro, Oregon.
92460 – for static display by the Connecticut Air and Space Center in Stratford, Connecticut.
92490 – to airworthiness by private owner in Pembroke Pines, Florida.
92618 – to airworthiness by private owner in Pembroke Pines, Florida.
92642 – to airworthiness by private owner in Castro Valley, California.
92643 – to airworthiness by private owner in Pembroke Pines, Florida.

Sortable Traits

References

Vought F4U Corsairs